Jaynne Berrier Bittner [JB] (March 17, 1926 – April 23, 2017) was a starting pitcher who played from  through  for four teams of the All-American Girls Professional Baseball League.

Biography
Bittner was a top all-around athlete in high school. She won the tennis championship three years in a row, held the table tennis crown for two years and was the leading scorer on the basketball team. An AAGPBL scout signed her after seeing her basketball prowess, thinking that she had athletic abilities, endurance and fitness necessary to play baseball. She attended a league tryout in Allentown, Pennsylvania, and later was sent to the 1948 spring training held in Cuba. She had no baseball position, but the league was desperate for overhand pitchers, so she was a good pitching prospect.

Bittner entered the league in 1947 with the South Bend Blue Sox, playing for them one year before joining the Muskegon Lassies (1948),  Grand Rapids Chicks (1949–52) and Fort Wayne Daisies (1952–53). Bittner posted a 9–9 record with a 2.55 earned run average as a 22-year-old rookie. Although she led the league in wild pitches (13) in 1949 and the following year issued the most balks (five), Bittner emerged in 1951 with Grand Rapids posting a 15–8 mark and a 2.95 ERA. Her most productive season came in 1953 with Fort Wayne, when she posted a 16–7 record and a 2.45 ERA. The Daisies made it to the playoffs in every year that Bittner pitched for them, but never won the Championship Title. She returned to the Chicks in 1954, which turned out to be the AAGPBL's last ever season.

After the league folded, Bittner moved to Detroit, Michigan and drove a school bus. She also coached a softball team for 20 years. In 1980, Bittner became the first woman inducted in the Pennsylvania Sports Hall of Fame. Since 1988 she is part of Women in Baseball, a permanent display based at the Baseball Hall of Fame and Museum in Cooperstown, New York, which was unveiled to honor the entire All-American Girls Professional Baseball League.  Bittner died on April 23, 2017 in Ann Arbor, Michigan.

Pitching statistics

Sources

External links
All-American Girls Professional Baseball League – Jaynne Bittner. Retrieved 2019-03-27.
Baseball Historian
Pennsylvania Sports Hall of Fame Website

1926 births
2017 deaths
All-American Girls Professional Baseball League players
Baseball players from Pennsylvania
People from Lebanon, Pennsylvania
People from Plymouth, Michigan
South Bend Blue Sox players
Muskegon Lassies players
Grand Rapids Chicks players
Fort Wayne Daisies players
Baseball pitchers
21st-century American women